KQOH (91.9 FM) is a radio station broadcasting a Religious format. Licensed to Marshfield, Missouri, United States, the station is currently owned by Catholic Radio Network, Inc.

References

External links
 
 

QOH